David Adelman may refer to:

David E. Adelman, American lawyer and academic
David I. Adelman (born 1964),  American lawyer, diplomat, and legislator
David J. Adelman (born 1974),  American businessman, entrepreneur, and philanthropist